Mahd al-Aadiyya was supposedly an Arab poet from around 4000 BCE. She is unlikely to have existed: Rather she is a chronicle character who is portrayed uttering the earliest example of a muzdawaj (heroic couplet) form warning the people of ʿĀd of their impending destruction by Allah, in accordance with the prophecies of the prophet Hud.

Anthologies
Classical Poems by Arab Women; translated by Abdullah al-Udhari, Saqi Books, 1999.

References

Arabic-language women poets
Arabic-language poets
Pre-Islamic Arabian poets
Arabian mythology